Clarence Newton Wakefield (September 18, 1894 - July 29, 1967) served in the California State Assembly for the 61st district from 1931 to 1933 and during World War I he served in the United States Army.

References

External links

United States Navy personnel of World War I
20th-century American politicians
Republican Party members of the California State Assembly
1894 births
1967 deaths